Booked Out is a 2012 comedy-drama film starring Mirren Burke, Rollo Weeks (in his final film role before his retirement from acting in 2012), Claire Garvey, and Sylvia Syms. It is the first film of writer and director Bryan  O'Neil and premiered at the Prince Charles Cinema on 6 March 2012, before going on a limited release across the United Kingdom.

The film was mostly shot over 19 days in March 2010, with two days of reshoots in August that year. The total estimated budget was £600,000.

Plot
Booked Out follows the quirky exploits of the Polaroid loving artist Ailidh (Mirren Burke) as she spies and photographs the occupants of her block of flats. Jacob (Rollo Weeks), the boy next door who comes and goes quicker than Ailidh can take pictures. Jacqueline (Claire Garvey), the mysterious girl that Jacob is visiting and the slightly crazy Mrs Nicholls (Sylvia Syms) who Ailidh helps cope with her husband's continuing existence after his death.

Cast
Mirren Burke as Ailidh
Rollo Weeks as Jacob
Claire Garvey as Jacqueline
Sylvia Syms as Mrs Nicholls
Gabriela Montaraz as Treacle
Tim FitzHigham as Bookworm Man
Simon Selmon as Swing Dance Teacher
Elizabeth Healey as Art Class Teacher
Kris Abrahams as Norman

References

External links
 Booked Out Official Website
 Booked Out on IMDb
 London Evening Standard review of Booked Out
 The Scotsman review of Booked Out

2012 films
British comedy-drama films
Films shot at Elstree Film Studios
Films set in London
2012 comedy-drama films
2010s English-language films
2010s British films